Robert Greig (December 27, 1879 – June 27, 1958) was an Australian-American actor who appeared in more than 100 films between 1930 and 1949, usually as the dutiful butler. Born Arthur Alfred Bede Greig, he was the nephew of Australian politician and solicitor William Bede Dalley. He was commonly known as "Bob".

Career
Greig was born near Melbourne, in 1878. He married fellow actor Beatrice Denver Holloway in 1912. After a successful career in Melbourne, he and his wife sailed for the United States, and he made his Broadway debut in 1928 in an operetta, Countess Maritza.  His next production was the Marx Brothers' comedy Animal Crackers, in which he portrayed "Hives" the butler. He reprised the role in the 1930 film version,  which was his movie debut and set the pattern for much of his career, as he was often cast as a butler or other servant.

He performed in several other productions on Broadway, the last in 1938. Greig worked steadily in films, again appearing with the Marx Brothers in Horse Feathers (1932), in which he played a biology professor, and was featured in the 1932 short Jitters the Butler. Notable films in which he broke out of butler-mode were Cockeyed Cavaliers (1934), starring Bert Wheeler and Robert Woolsey, in which Greig played the "Duke of Weskit", Uncle John to Irene Dunne's Theodora in Theodora Goes Wild (1936),  and Algiers (1938), in which he was "Giraux", the wealthy and gross protector of Hedy Lamarr's character.

In the 1940s, Greig was part of Preston Sturges' unofficial "stock company" of character actors, appearing in six films written and directed by Sturges.<ref>Greig appeared in The Lady Eve, Sullivan's Travels, The Palm Beach Story, The Great Moment, The Sin of Harold Diddlebock and Unfaithfully Yours. He also acted in I Married a Witch, which Sturges produced, and had appeared earlier in Easy Living, written by Sturges.</ref>  His performances in Sullivan's Travels, The Lady Eve and The Palm Beach Story, in which he played a member of the "Ale & Quail Club", were among his best.

Greig's last film was Bride of Vengeance, a 1949 Paulette Goddard vehicle, in which he played the uncredited part of a "Councillor."

Death
Greig died in Los Angeles on June 27, 1958 at the age of 78: he is buried in Holy Cross Cemetery in Culver City, California.

FilmographyParamount on Parade (1930) - Minor Role (film debut) (uncredited)Animal Crackers (1930) - Hives, the butlerNo Limit (1931) - Doorman (uncredited)Born to Love (1931) - Hansom Cabby (uncredited)Tonight or Never (1931) - ConradStepping Sisters (1932) - JepsonLovers Courageous (1932) - Doorman (uncredited)The Cohens and Kellys in Hollywood (1932) - ChesterfieldBeauty and the Boss (1932) - ChappelMan Wanted (1932) - Harper (scenes cut)The Tenderfoot (1932) - MackMerrily We Go to Hell (1932) - Baritone Bartender (uncredited)Jewel Robbery (1932) - Man Reading 'Wiener Journal' (uncredited)Horse Feathers (1932) - Biology Professor Giving Lecture (uncredited)Love Me Tonight (1932) - Major Domo FlammandTrouble in Paradise (1932) - Jacques, Mariette's butlerThe Conquerors (1932) - Mr. Downey (uncredited)They Just Had to Get Married (1932) - RadcliffRobbers' Roost (1932) - Tulliver the ButlerJitters the Butler (1932 short) - JittersMen Must Fight (1933) - AlbertDangerously Yours (1933) - WhiteThe Mind Reader (1933) - Swami (uncredited)Pleasure Cruise (1933) - CrumPeg o' My Heart (1933) - Jarvis, butlerHorse Play (1933) - Hotel Doorman (uncredited)Midnight Mary (1933) - Potter - Tom's Butler (uncredited)It's Great to Be Alive (1933) - PerkinsBroadway to Hollywood (1933) - "Diamond Jim" Brady (uncredited)Meet the Baron (1933) - Explorer (uncredited)Female (1933) - James, Alison's butler (uncredited)Easy to Love (1934) - AndrewsUpper World (1934) - Marc Caldwell, butlerStingaree (1934) - The InnkeeperThe Love Captive (1934) - First ButlerMadame Du Barry (1934) - The King's Chef (uncredited)Cockeyed Cavaliers (1934) - The Duke of WeskitOne More River (1934) - BloreClive of India (1935) - Mr. PembertonFolies Bergère de Paris (1935) - HenriLes Misérables (1935) - Prison Governor at Jean's Release (uncredited)Mark of the Vampire (1935) - Fat Man (uncredited)Woman Wanted (1935) - PeedlesThe Gay Deception (1935) - AdolphThe Bishop Misbehaves (1935) - RosalindI Live for Love (1935) - Fat Man Dancing at NightclubThree Live Ghosts (1936) - John Ferguson, Brockton's butlerRose Marie (1936) - Hotel ManagerThe Great Ziegfeld (1936) - Ziegfeld's Butler (uncredited)The Unguarded Hour (1936) - HendersonSmall Town Girl (1936) - Childers, Dakin's butlerTrouble for Two (1936) - Fat ManThe Devil-Doll (1936) - Emil CoulvetEasy to Take (1936) - Judd - ButlerTheodora Goes Wild (1936) - Uncle JohnLloyd's of London (1936) - Lord DraytonStowaway (1936) - CaptainMichael O'Halloran (1937) - Craig, the butlerThe Road Back (1937) - Member of Dinner Party (uncredited)Easy Living (1937) - ButlerMy Dear Miss Aldrich (1937) - The Major DomoLady Behave! (1937) - AlfredAlgiers (1938) - Andre GirauxMidnight Intruder (1938) - Willetts, the Reitter ButlerThe Adventures of Marco Polo (1938) - ChamberlainYou Can't Take It with You (1938) - Lord Melville (uncredited)The Law West of Tombstone (1938) - Townsman at Table (uncredited)It Could Happen to You (1939) - PedleyWay Down South (1939) - Judge RavenalLittle Accident (1939) - Butler (uncredited)Drums Along the Mohawk (1939) - Mr. BorstTower of London (1939) - Friar Cautioning John Wyatt (uncredited)The Honeymoon's Over (1939) - Horace KelloggCharlie McCarthy, Detective (1939)  (uncredited)No Time for Comedy (1940) - RobertThe Thief of Bagdad (1940) - Man of Basra (uncredited)Hudson's Bay (1941) - Sir RobertThe Lady Eve (1941) - BurrowsMoon Over Miami (1941) - BrearleyHello, Sucker (1941) - Mr. Watson (uncredited)My Life with Caroline (1941) - Albert (uncredited)Sullivan's Travels (1941) - Sullivan's ButlerSon of Fury: The Story of Benjamin Blake (1942) - JudgeThe Mad Martindales (1942) - Wallace ButlerI Married an Angel (1942) - Oscar (uncredited)Tales of Manhattan (1942) - Lazar the Tailor (Boyer sequence) (uncredited)The Palm Beach Story (1942) - Third Member Ale and Quail ClubGirl Trouble (1942) - FieldsThe Moon and Sixpence (1942) - Maitland, Wolfe's valet (uncredited)I Married a Witch (1942) - Town CrierLaugh Your Blues Away (1942) - WilfredArabian Nights (1942) - EunuchThree Hearts for Julia (1943) - Cairns, Anton's Butler (uncredited)Million Dollar Kid (1944) - Spevin, Cortlands' butlerSummer Storm (1944) - Gregory, Volsky's butlerThe Great Moment (1944) - Roberts, Morton's butler (uncredited)Mrs. Parkington (1944) - Mr. Orlando (uncredited)The Picture of Dorian Gray (1945) - Sir ThomasEarl Carroll Vanities (1945) - Vonce, the butlerHollywood and Vine (1945) - JenkinsNob Hill (1945) - Patton, Curruthers' butler (uncredited)The Cheaters (1945) - MacFarlandLove, Honor and Goodbye (1945) - Charles, the butlerThe Sin of Harold Diddlebock (1947) - Algernon McNiffForever Amber (1947) - Magistrate (uncredited)Unfaithfully Yours (1948) - Jules, the valet (uncredited)Bride of Vengeance'' (1949) - Councillor

Notes

External links

Robert Greig's Australian theatre credits at AusStage

1879 births
1958 deaths
Male actors from Melbourne
American male film actors
American male stage actors
Australian male film actors
Australian male stage actors
20th-century American male actors
20th-century Australian male actors
Burials at Holy Cross Cemetery, Culver City
Australian emigrants to the United States